Oyoko is a small town in the Sekyere Kumawu District of the Ashanti Region of Ghana. The town is in the Kumawu parliamentary constituency.

Notable places
There are two notable places in the town. One is the Optical Technician Training Institute (OTTI), which is the only school in Ghana for the training of opticians. The other notable place is the Westphalian Children's Village orphanage. Its clinic specializes in treating various eye conditions.

See also
 Eye care in Ghana

References

Populated places in the Ashanti Region